The Colombia women's national under-18 and under-19 basketball team is a national basketball team of Colombia, administered by the Federación Colombiana de Baloncesto.

It represents the country in international under-18 and under-19 (under age 18 and under age 19) women's basketball competitions.

See also
Colombia women's national basketball team
Colombia women's national under-17 basketball team
Colombia men's national under-19 basketball team

References

External links
Archived records of Colombia team participations

B
Women's national under-19 basketball teams